Glina is a word of Slavic origin, meaning "clay". It may refer to:

Glina (river) in Croatia and Bosnia and Herzegovina
Glina, Croatia, a town in Croatia
Glina massacres, 1941
Glina, Piotrków County in Łódź Voivodeship (central Poland)
Glina, Sieradz County in Łódź Voivodeship (central Poland)
Glina, Tomaszów Mazowiecki County in Łódź Voivodeship (central Poland)
Glina, Lipsko County in Masovian Voivodeship (east-central Poland)
Glina, Ostrów Mazowiecka County in Masovian Voivodeship (east-central Poland)
Glina, Otwock County in Masovian Voivodeship (east-central Poland)
Glina, Węgrów County in Masovian Voivodeship (east-central Poland)
Glina, Pomeranian Voivodeship (north Poland)
Glina, Ilfov, a commune in Ilfov County, Romania
Glina, Bloke, a village in Slovenia
Slovene name for Glan (Gurk), a tributary of Gurk in Carinthia, Austria

See also 
Glinka (disambiguation)
Hlinka